Dulce de leche, also known as caramelized milk, milk candy or milk jam in English, is a confection popular in Latin America prepared by slowly heating sugar and milk over a period of several hours. The resulting substance, which takes on a spreadable, sauce-like consistency, derives its rich flavour and colour from non-enzymatic browning. It is typically used to top or fill other sweet foods.

Dulce de leche is Spanish for "sweet [made] of milk". Other regional names in Spanish include manjar ("delicacy") and arequipe; in Mexico and some Central American countries dulce de leche made with goat's milk is called 'cajeta'. In French it is called confiture de lait. It is also known under the name of kajmak in Polish cuisine, where it was independently created based on Turkish kaymak, a kind of clotted cream. Kajmak is most commonly used for wafers or the mazurek pie traditionally eaten on Easter.

Preparation and uses 

The most basic recipe calls for slowly simmering milk and sugar, stirring almost constantly until the sugar dissolves (baking soda then can be added), after more constant stirring (between 1.5 - 2 hours) until the mixture thickens and finally turns a rich brown golden-brown colour.

Another method calls for letting a gallon of milk stand in room temperature for an entire 24 hours. The gases will spoil the milk and what is left is curd and whey. This is then boiled, causing the solids to flow to the top. The solids are removed and sugar is added. This mixture is stirred until it becomes hard, after which it is removed from the heat and left to cool. After it cools, it is broken up for consumption. Out of a gallon, this method yields about two cups.

Other ingredients such as vanilla may be added for flavor. Much of the water in the milk evaporates and the mix thickens; the resulting dulce de leche is usually about a sixth of the volume of the milk used. The transformation that occurs in preparation is caused by a combination of two common non-enzymatic browning reactions called caramelization and the Maillard reaction.

A homemade form of dulce de leche sometimes is made by boiling an unopened can of sweetened condensed milk for two to three hours (or 30 to 45 minutes in a pressure cooker), particularly by those living in countries where it cannot be bought ready-made. This results in a product that is much sweeter than the slow-boiled kind. This method could be dangerous, and should not be done on a stove: if the pot is allowed to boil dry, the can will overheat and explode.

Dulce de leche can be eaten alone, but is more commonly used as a topping or filling for other sweet foods, such as cakes, churros, cookies (see alfajor), waffles, crème caramel (known as flan in Spanish-speaking regions and pudim in Portuguese-speaking ones), fruits like bananas and candied figs, and ice creams; it is also a popular spread on crepes (panqueques), obleas (wafers), and toast, while the French variant confiture de lait is commonly served with fromage blanc.

Gallery

See also

Footnotes

References

Confectionery
Latin American cuisine
Milk dishes
Spreads (food)
Argentine cuisine
Paraguayan cuisine
Uruguayan cuisine
Polish cuisine
Mexican cuisine
Dominican Republic cuisine
Colombian cuisine
Cuban cuisine
Venezuelan cuisine
Brazilian cuisine